Delicias station is a Madrid Metro station in Madrid city centre. It was opened on 26 March 1949 and is situated near the Railway Museum.

It should not be confused with the similarly named station of Cercanías Madrid, as there is no direct access between the two.

References

Line 3 (Madrid Metro) stations
Railway stations in Spain opened in 1949